The Drones is the first recording released by Perth band the Drones. It is a self-titled demo EP with a limited run of 500. The first four tracks would go on to appear on their debut full-length album.

Track listing

 "Six Ways to Sunday"
 "Motherless Children" (Blind Willie Johnson cover)
 "Dekalb Blues" (Lead Belly cover)[*]
 "The Island"
 "The Scrap Iron Sky" (Live on 3CR Radio)
 "Dekalb Blues" (Live on 3CR Radio)

[*](incorporates "See See Rider" by Ma Rainey)

2001 EPs
The Drones (Australian band) albums